KMET (1490 kHz) is a commercial AM radio station that is licensed to Banning, California and serves the eastern part of the Riverside—San Bernardino area. The station is owned by Christopher Miller, through licensee KMET, LLC, and broadcasts a talk radio format.

Programming
KMET is an ABC radio affiliate and airs syndicated talk programming from hosts such as Clark Howard, Dave Ramsey, Tyler Jorgenson, and Kevin McCullough, as well as sports coverage. Local on-air talent includes Brett Malak, Aaron Michael Sanchez, Paul Amadeus Lane, and Mitch McClellan.

KMET sports programming includes Los Angeles Rams and Los Angeles Lakers games. From 2011 through the end of the 2016–2017 NHL season, KMET was the Inland Empire radio affiliate of the Los Angeles Kings.

History
The station began in 1945 as KPAC for the nearby Southern Pacific Railroad. In the 1950s the call sign was changed to KPAS to stand for the San Gorgonio Pass; this later became KGUD.

On March 1, 1987, KGUD adopted the KMET call letters to represent the Riverside—San Bernardino metropolitan area and Hemet, a community south of Banning. KMET aired a middle of the road format branded "The Mighty Met" in honor of the defunct Los Angeles rock station that previously held the KMET call letters (94.7 FM, now KTWV).

Prior to July 2007, KMET aired a smooth jazz music format branded as "Your Smooth Oasis". Before that, formats included country music in 1995 and all-sports.

References

External links

MET
Talk radio stations in the United States
Banning, California
Radio stations established in 1948
1948 establishments in California